Educational Evaluation and Policy Analysis is a peer-reviewed academic journal covering all aspects of educational policy analysis. It was established in 1979 and is published by SAGE Publications on behalf of the American Educational Research Association. The editors are Joseph R. Cimpian (New York University), Julie A. Marsh (University of Southern California), Paco Martorell (University of California, Davis), and Morgan Polikoff (University of Southern California).

Mission Statement 
Educational Evaluation and Policy Analysis (EEPA) publishes scholarly manuscripts of theoretical, methodological, or policy interest to those engaged in educational policy analysis, evaluation, and decision making. EEPA is a multidisciplinary policy journal, and considers original research from multiple disciplines, theoretical orientations, and methodologies.

Abstracting and indexing 
The journal is abstracted and indexed in Scopus and the Social Sciences Citation Index. According to the Journal Citation Reports, its 2018 impact factor is 3.127, ranking it 18th out of 238 journals in the category "Education & Educational Research".

References

External links 
 

SAGE Publishing academic journals
English-language journals
Publications established in 1979
Quarterly journals
Education journals